Cartusia Kartuzy is a Polish football club based in Kartuzy, Poland.

External links
 Cartusia Kartuzy official website (Polish)
 Cartusia Kartuzy at the 90minut.pl website (Polish)

Association football clubs established in 1923
1923 establishments in Poland
Kartuzy County
Football clubs in Pomeranian Voivodeship